"Shy Guy" is a song by Jamaican recording artist and songwriter Diana King for the movie soundtrack album Bad Boys. It also appeared on King's debut studio album, Tougher Than Love (1995). The song was written by King, Kingsley Gardner and Andy Marvel, who produced the song as well. It was released by Sony Music worldwide in 1995 as the lead single from Tougher Than Love. The song contains a sample from "School Boy Crush" by Average White Band.

The song received positive reviews from music critics, with many saying it was a definite highlight of the album and calling it one of the best reggae fusion songs of its time. AllMusic said the song was a highlight of both the soundtrack and King's debut album. "Shy Guy" also received chart success. The song peaked at number thirteen in the United States and went to number two in the United Kingdom. It topped the charts in Finland, Sweden and Zimbabwe and became a top-five hit in several other countries, including Australia, Ireland, the Netherlands, New Zealand and Norway.

Critical reception
Devon Jackson from Entertainment Weekly	picked "Shy Guy" as a standout on the Bad Boys soundtrack, complimenting it as "a seamless merging of Anita Baker and dancehall reggae." Dave Sholin from the Gavin Report stated that King's artistry "will be discovered by the masses who hear this song via the airwaves and the soundtrack of the new Will Smith and Martin Lawrence film, Bad Boys. Hot tune, hot movie and a lot of airplay—that'll work!" Bianca Gracie from Idolator noted that "the breezy mid-tempo dance tune features sassy lyrics that are peppered with patois inflections that urge women everywhere to realize they deserve more than what these f*ck boys are offering." A reviewer from Music & Media said that "Miss King provides prospect for the no-hopers. Move over fly guys, Diana wants a shy guy. Within the context of a mix of ragga and swingbeat, she joyfully sings and raps about the timid type." Stephen Meade from The Network Forty wrote that "reggae flava with ultra-smooth vocals lead us to a hook we can't forget." Rune Slyngstad from Norwegian newspaper Nordlandsposten described the song as "pulsating and catchy".

Chart performance
"Shy Guy" was released as the lead single on both King's album and the soundtrack of Bad Boys. The song received charting success worldwide. The song debuted at number thirty-five on the Australian Singles Chart and later peaked at number three, staying at the position for three consecutive weeks. The song later debuted at number twenty-eight on the New Zealand Singles Chart. After seventeen weeks, it peaked at number three for one week. The song peaked at number thirteen on the US Billboard Hot 100 and number twenty-one on the Billboard Hot R&B Singles chart. It was certified gold by the Recording Industry Association of America (RIAA), selling over 500,000 copies in the US.

The song also had success in Europe. It debuted at number six on the Swiss Singles Chart, then peaked at number five for three consecutive weeks. It debuted at number thirty on the Austrian Singles Chart, and rose to number six for one week. The song later debuted at number twenty-seven on the French Singles Chart and rose to peak at number four, staying there for two consecutive weeks. The song was certified silver in France, selling over 125,000 copies there. The song reached number one on two charts. It debuted at number twenty-seven in Sweden before rising to number one for one week, while in Finland, the song remained at number one for four non-consecutive weeks. It also peaked at number two in Norway, staying there for seven consecutive weeks. The song debuted at number four on the UK Singles Chart, then peaked at number two. It was certified Silver in the United Kingdom.

Music videos
Two music videos were made: one in black and white, directed by Marcus Nispel, for the Tougher Than Love album; the other, directed by Michael Bay, for the Bad Boys soundtrack with Will Smith and Martin Lawrence appearing in it. That video features King dancing and singing to the song in a very cold-looking environment, but through the chorus they are seen dancing on a runway looking stage.

Track listings

 CD single
 "Shy Guy" (radio edit) — 3:39
 "Shy Guy" (darpe mix) — 3:41

 CD maxi
 "Shy Guy" (radio edit) — 3:39
 "Shy Guy" (darpe mix) — 3:41
 "Shy Guy" (randB mix) — 3:36
 "Shy Guy" (dancehall mix) — 5:00
 "Shy Guy" (dancehall dub) — 4:54

 7" single
 "Shy Guy" (radio edit) — 3:39
 "Shy Guy" (darpe mix) — 3:41

 12" single
 "Shy Guy" (radio edit) — 3:39
 "Shy Guy" (darpe mix) — 3:41
 "Shy Guy" (randB mix) — 3:36
 "Shy Guy" (dancehall mix) — 5:00
 "Shy Guy" (dancehall dub) — 4:54

Charts and certifications

Weekly charts

Year-end charts

Certifications

Covers and samples
In 1998, a cover version of the song called Jeito Sexy became the first hit of Brazilian band Fat Family.

In December 2008, Mýa recorded a cover version of "Shy Guy" with the words in English rather than in the patois that King's version was recorded in. This was included on Mýa's 2008 Japan-only album Sugar & Spice but was not released as a single.

Lyric McFarland sang the song in the Blind Auditions for Season 2 of The Voice Australia. It earned her a mentorship from Joel Madden.

DTwinz sang the song in the Blind Auditions for series 4 of the UK series The Voice UK. They managed to turn 3-chairs and chose Rita Ora as their coach.

In 2016, Belgian singer Unicq released her own bilingual French / English version under the title "Mercy (Shy Guy)". The single reached number 76 on the SNEP chart, the French official singles chart.

The chorus of the 2016 song "Don't Hurt Me" by DJ Mustard and Nicki Minaj contains an interpolation of "Shy Guy".

References

1995 singles
1995 songs
Bad Boys (franchise)
Black-and-white music videos
Diana King songs
European Hot 100 Singles number-one singles
Music videos directed by Marcus Nispel
Music videos directed by Michael Bay
Number-one singles in Finland
Number-one singles in Sweden
Number-one singles in Zimbabwe
Songs written by Andy Marvel
Songs written for films